Unión Deportiva Talavera is a football team based in Talavera de la Reina in the autonomous community of Castilla-La Mancha. 

Founded in 1993, it plays in the Tercera División – Group 18. Its stadium is El Prado with a capacity of 2,000 seats.

Season to season

7 seasons in Tercera División

External links
Official website 
Futbolme team profile 

Football clubs in Castilla–La Mancha
Association football clubs established in 1993
1993 establishments in Spain
Sport in Talavera de la Reina